Le Plessier-sur-Saint-Just (literally Le Plessier on Saint-Just) is a commune in the Oise department in northern France.

See also
Communes of the Oise department

References

Communes of Oise